Guyana is known as the "Land of many rivers", so bridges are an important aspect of the country's transportation infrastructure. Guyana suffers from infrastructural weakness, and many bridges were poorly built or have failed to receive proper maintenance. The country has one international bridge connecting Guyana to Brazil in the south. Plans have been made to build a bridge over the Courantyne River to connect to Suriname in the east.

This is a list of bridges in Guyana.

 Berbice Bridge near New Amsterdam, Guyana
 Demerara Harbour Bridge near Georgetown, Guyana
 Denham Suspension Bridge, also known as the Garraway Stream Bridge, links Mahdia to Bartica
 Takutu River Bridge near Lethem, Guyana and Bonfim, Roraima, Brazil

References 

Guyana
Bridges
Bridges